September 17, 1969, released in the UK as Holiday, is a studio album by Brazilian bossa nova singer Astrud Gilberto, released on Verve Records in 1969. The album was recorded at Century Sound Studios, New York City, New York. The album cover photograph was taken by Don Martin at 399 E 43rd Street, Manhattan, New York City.

Reception
The AllMusic review says that "Highlights do crop up, with the opener 'Beginnings' working very well except for its long coda, and the one Brazilian song, 'Let Go (Canto de Ossanha)' charting the perfect balance between timeless pop and late-'60s crossover appeal." Stereo Review called the material "flawless," writing that all the songs are "first-rate."

Track listing
 "Beginnings" – 8:08
 "Holiday" – 3:12
 "Here, There and Everywhere" – 2:26
 "Light My Fire" – 2:57
 "Let Go (Canto de Ossanha)" – 3:07
 "Let's Have the Morning After (Instead of the Night Before)" – 4:09
 "Think of Rain" – 2:48
 "A Million Miles Away Behind the Door" – 2:29
 "Love Is Stronger Far Than We" – 3:44
 "Don't Leave Me Baby" – 2:32
 "Summer Sweet, Pts. 1–2 to Be Continued" – 6:31

References

External links
 

1969 albums
Astrud Gilberto albums
Albums produced by Brooks Arthur
Verve Records albums